Now You See It may refer to:

 Now You See It (American game show), a 1974–1975 game show, resurrected in 1989
 Now You See It (Australian game show), a 1985–1999 children's game show
 Now You See It (British game show), a 1981–1995 British television game show
 "Now You See It" (Shake That Ass), a 2009 song by Honorebel
 Now You See It, an Oscar-nominated live-action short film by Pete Smith
 Now You See It, a novel by Stuart M. Kaminsky
 Now You See It (book), a 2011 book by Cathy Davidson
 Now You See It, a play by Georges Feydeau published as Le Système Ribadier 
 Now You See It, a BBC magic and entertainment show, narrated by Mel Giedroyc
 Now You See It..., a 2005 Disney Channel Original Movie

See also 
 Now You See Me (disambiguation)
 Now You See Me, Now You Don't (disambiguation)
 Now You See It, Now You Don't (disambiguation)
 Now You See Me (film), a 2013 American caper thriller film
 Now You See Me 2, a 2016 film and sequel to the 2013 film Now You See Me